Arian Hametaj (born 1 July 1957) is an Albanian retired footballer, who played as a defender for Partizani Tirana football club.

Club career
Normal as it was in communist Albania, Hametaj only played for one club: Partizani. He won the 1986/87 league title with them, alongside fellow international players Adnan Ocelli, Lefter Millo and Sokol Kushta.

International career
He made his debut for Albania in a September 1982 European Championship qualification match against Austria in Vienna and earned a total of 10 caps, scoring no goals.

His final international was a March 1985 friendly match against Turkey.

Honours
Albanian Superliga: 1
 1987

References

External links

1957 births
Living people
Association football defenders
Albanian footballers
Albania international footballers
FK Partizani Tirana players
Kategoria Superiore players